Scopula nebulata is a moth of the family Geometridae. It was described by David Stephen Fletcher in 1963. It is found in the Democratic Republic of the Congo and Rwanda.

References

Moths described in 1963
nebulata
Moths of Africa